

Station List

Oa - Of

Og - Oj

Ok - Or

Os - Oz

P 

O